The 2022 British cabinet reshuffle can refer to:

July 2022 British cabinet reshuffle by the 2nd Johnson ministry
September 2022 appointment of ministers at the beginning of the Truss ministry
October 2022 appointment of ministers at the beginning of the Sunak ministry